The 2004 Baltimore Ravens season was the team's ninth season in the NFL. They were unable to improve upon their previous output of 10–6 and a playoff appearance, instead going 9–7 and missing the playoffs.

The 2004 season was the subject of the John Feinstein non-fiction book Next Man Up; the result of Feinstein spending the season behind the scenes with the team.

It was highlighted by then-37-year-old Deion Sanders making a comeback after three years out of football. Meanwhile, Jamal Lewis, who was coming off a historic 2003 season, was arrested for drug charges and earned a two-game suspension by the NFL. He would finish the season with just 1,006 yards rushing as the Ravens were one of the worst offenses in the NFL in 2004. Ed Reed, who had 9 interceptions for the season, was named Defensive Player of the Year.

For the season, the Ravens introduced black alternate uniforms for the first time in franchise history.

Draft

Staff

Roster

Preseason

Schedule

Regular season

Schedule
In addition to their regular games with AFC North divisional rivals, the Ravens played against the AFC East and NFC East based on the NFL’s schedule rotation introduced in 2002, and also played against the Chiefs and the Colts, who had in 2003 finished first in the two remaining AFC divisions.

Week 2: vs. Pittsburgh Steelers

Steelers starting quarterback Tommy Maddox would suffer an injury during this game, sending 2004 first-round pick Ben Roethlisberger out on the field. After the game, Roethlisberger would lead the Steelers to fourteen straight victories to end the season. Thus, this marked the only loss the Steelers suffered during the regular season.

Standings

References 

Baltimore Ravens seasons
Baltimore Ravens
Baltimore Ravens
2000s in Baltimore